The Hyderabad (Sind) National Collegiate Board or HSNC Board is an Indian non-profit organisation founded in 1922 (or 1919) in the British India province of Sind and moved to Bombay, India after the 1947 Partition.
It is one of the oldest educational trusts of India and currently administers 27 institutes under its umbrella including the HSNC University, Mumbai.

History

The Hyderabad (Sind) National Collegiate Board, well known as HSNC board, is a charitable trust established by the Sindhi Community in 1922. It currently manages and administers 27 institutes under its umbrella and is presided by Mr Kishu Mansukhani.

The first college established by this Board in post-independence India was the Rishi Dayaram Gidumal National College or R. D. National College (commonly known as National College) founded in 1949 and located on Linking Road, Bandra.

However, the R.D. National College, Bandra traces its roots back to the D.G. National College that was established in 1917 at Hyderabad, Sind of Bombay Presidency, by the Sindhi-speaking Hindu community, under the inspiration of Dr. Annie Besant, President of Theosophical Society and Rishi Dayaram Gidumal, a Sindhi Hindu religious leader.
It was first named as "Sind National Arts College Hyderabad" and inaugurated on 1 October 1917 at Besant Hall, Hyderabad by Dr. Ernest Wood who also became its first Principal.  It was registered by the HSNC Board in February 1919 and was affiliated with Bombay University in 1921 to offer B.A. and later, B.Sc. degrees. 
In 1928, it was renamed  to Dayaram Gidumal National College, Hyderabad (Sind) (or in short, 'D.G. National College') and remained so until 1947 when Partition happened. 
Some of its famous Alumni included the veteran BJP leader L. K. Advani.
In 1930, Mr. K.M. Kundnani joined D.G. National College as Lecturer and became the Principal in 1947.
After Partition, Mr. Kundnani moved to India and re-established the college in Bandra, Mumbai in 1949, with critical assistance from Advocate H.G. Advani.  In fact, the entire HSNC Board was also moved from Hyderabad to Bombay along with its equipment, books and movable possessions and was re-established in Bombay.

The college that remained in Pakistan was suspended during 1947-1948 and got renamed as Government College Hyderabad (a.k.a. Kali Mori College) as it was taken over by the Government of Sind, Pakistan. 
In 2017, the Government of Sindh, Pakistan announced that it shall be upgraded to a University, as it completed one century of existence.

As of 2020, HSNC University has come into existence. It is a cluster university consisting of three prestigious colleges of the board; namely, KC College, HR College & Bombay Teacher's training Institute (BTTI). The University was launched on 11 June by Mr. Bhagat Singh Koshyari, the then-Governor of Maharashtra, in presence of Mr. Uddhav Thackeray, the Then-Chief Minister of Maharashtra

Colleges

The HSNCB has founded and operates several other educational institutions in India:

Colaba Campus, Mumbai 
 The Bombay Teachers' Training College - offering Diplomas and Baccalaureates in Education (B.Ed. & D.Ed.)
Kishinchand Chellaram College of Management Studies - offering PG (Post-graduate) diplomas in Business management, sports management, advertising, corporate communications, etc.

Cuffe Parade Campus, Mumbai 
 The Bombay School of Business
Principal K.M. Kundnani College of Pharmacy

Churchgate Campus, Mumbai 
Kishinchand Chellaram College
Kishinchand Chellaram Law College
H.R. College of Commerce and Economics

Bandra Campus, Mumbai 
 Rishi Dayaram and Seth Hassaram National College and Seth Wassiamul Assomul Science College
Mithibai Motiram Kundnani College of Commerce & Economic
Gopaldas Jhamatmal Advani Law College
Thadomal Shahani Engineering College

Worli Campus, Mumbai 
The Bombay Institute of Technology - Digital Electronics, Computer Technology, Chemical Engineering

Ulhasnagar Campus 

 Watumull Institute of Electronic Engineering, Computer Technology and Instrumentation
 The Smt Chandibai Himathmal Mansukhani College of Arts, Commerce and Science
 Nari Gursahani Law College
 The Principal K.M. Kundnani Pharmacy Polytechnic
 The Institute of Technology - Digital Electronics, Computer Technology, Information Technology
 Shri Hashmatrai and Gangaram Himmatmal Mansukhani Institute of Management
Dr. L.H. Hiranandani College Of Pharmacy

Schools

The HSNC Board also operates the following schools:

 The R.K. Academy in Colaba, Mumbai
 The Valiram Bherumal Melwani Model High School in Grant Road, Mumbai
 The Master Sitaldas Chanshyamdas Punwani Tutorial High School in Grant Road, Mumbai.(Formerly Known as Master Tutorial High School.
 The Master Tutorial English Primary School in Grant Road, Mumbai
 The Sind Model English Primary School in Grant Road, Mumbai
 The Sri Gangaram Sind National Higher Secondary School in Ulhasnagar
 The Jai Hind Academy Higher Secondary School in Ulhasnagar
 The Little Angel's Academy in Grant Road, Mumbai

Famous alumni

Politicians & Government 
 L. K. Advani, currently senior leader of the Bharatiya Janta Party and former Deputy Prime Minister of India
 Piyush Goyal, Politician & Union Cabinet Minister (Railways, Commerce, etc.)
 Ram Naik, Indian politician and Governor of Uttar Pradesh
 Navjot Singh Sidhu, Former cricketer & Member of Parliament
 Aaditya Thackeray, Indian politician & Cabinet minister in Government of Maharashtra
 Amin Khandwani, Chairperson of the Maharashtra State Minority Commission
 Nirmala Samant-Prabhavalkar, Chairperson, Maharashtra State Women's Commission

Lawyers & Judges 
 Justice A.M Khanwilkar, Judge, Supreme Court of India
 Justice P.B Colabavala, Judge, Bombay High Court
 Justice Aloysius Aguiar, Additional Judge, Bombay High Court
 Sanjay Hegde, Senior Advocate, Supreme Court of India
 Ramnath Kini, Bombay High Court Advocate 
 Majid Memon, Bombay High Court Advocate

Film & TV Persons 
Suresh Wadkar, Famous playback singer
Shaan (singer), Pop and playback singer
Amjad Khan (actor), Stage and film actor noted for his comedian and villain roles (e.g. as "Gabbar Singh" in the iconic Hindi movie "Sholay")
Javed Jaffrey, Film actor and comedian
Rajesh Khanna, Famous Actor and Member of Parliament
 R. Madhavan, Film actor
 Varun Dhawan, Celebrated actor
 Karan Johar, Noted film director
 Ranbir Kapoor, Celebrated actor
 Neil Nitin Mukesh, Noted actor
 Ranveer Singh, Celebrated actor
 Sajid Nadiadwala, Film producer
 Farhan Akhtar, Film director, actor & producer
 Tanmay Bhat, Comedian & founder of AIB

Corporate Leaders 
 Anil Ambani, Chairman of the Anil Dhirubhai Ambani Group (Reliance ADAG Group)
 Kumar Mangalam Birla, Chairman, Aditya Birla Group
 Vikram Limaye, MD & CEO of the National Stock Exchange
 Rashesh Shah, Chairman, CEO and founder of Edelweiss Group; former president of FICCI
 Gautam Singhania, Chairman & MD, Raymonds Textiles)
 Kishore Biyani, Founder & CEO, Future Group (Big Bazaar & others)
 S. P. Hinduja, Chairman, Hinduja Group
 Nanik Rupani, Chairperson of the FICCI
 Avani Davda, MD of Godrej Nature's Basket
 Anant Bajaj, Ex-MD of Bajaj Electricals
 Anshuman Ruia, Director, Essar Group
 Deena Mehta, Ex-President, Bombay Stock Exchange
 Prashant Ruia, Managing Director, Essar Steel
 Ajay Chandwani, Managing Director, Lintas (an iconic bombay-based advertisement agency)
 Paritosh Joshi, TV executive & former president, Star India
 Sunil Lulla, CEO of BARC India & Former Group CEO of Balaji Telefilms

Others 
 Hari Mehra, President of the Khar Gymkhana Club
Brij Narayan, Noted Sarod player
 Dr. Indira Hinduja, Gynaecologist and pioneer in In-Vitro fertilisation in South Asia

References

Sources 
 The Nationalite, Prospectus of the R.D. National College, Bandra for the Academic year 2005-2006
Diwan Bherumal Meharchand. "Amilan Jo Ahwal"- 24 March 1919
 Amilan Jo Ahwal (1919) - Translated into English ("A History of the Amils") at www.saibaba-fund.org/sindhis.html

External links
 Official website

1922 establishments in India
Education in Maharashtra
Educational organisations based in India
History of education in India
Defunct educational institutions
Defunct organisations based in India
History of education in Pakistan